Aarne Lindroos (born 14 December 1960) is a Finnish rower. He competed at the 1984 Summer Olympics and the 1988 Summer Olympics.

References

External links
 

1960 births
Living people
Finnish male rowers
Olympic rowers of Finland
Rowers at the 1984 Summer Olympics
Rowers at the 1988 Summer Olympics
Sportspeople from Helsinki